L24 may refer to:

Automobile engines 
 Nissan L24 engine, a straight-six engine
 Saturn L24 engine, a straight-four engine

Aviation 
 Helio L-24 Courier, an American civil utility aircraft
 Paradise Skypark, an airport in Butte county, California

Proteins 
 60S ribosomal protein L24
 Mitochondrial ribosomal protein L24

Vessels 
 , a submarine of the Royal Navy
 , a destroyer of the Royal Navy
 , an amphibious warfare vessel of the Indian Navy
 Lapworth 24, an American sailboat design